Elías Sveinsson (born 10 January 1952) is an Icelandic athlete. He competed in the men's decathlon at the 1976 Summer Olympics.

References

1952 births
Living people
Athletes (track and field) at the 1976 Summer Olympics
Icelandic decathletes
Olympic athletes of Iceland
Place of birth missing (living people)